Duck Island can refer to any of a number of places, including:

 Duck island (garden feature)

Australia 
Duck Island (Victoria) in Australia
Wild Duck Island, in Australia's Northumberland Islands chain

Canada 
Duck Island (Newfoundland), one of the Wadham Islands
Duck Island (Lake Huron), Ontario
False Duck Island, in Lake Ontario
Main Duck Island, in Lake Ontario

United Kingdom 
Duck Island (Barnet) in the River Brent, Arkley, England
Duck Island, a small island in St. James's Park lake, London
Duck Island Cottage, the headquarters of the London Gardens Trust
Duck Island, County Antrim, a townland in County Antrim, Northern Ireland

United States 
Duck Island (Milford, Connecticut), an island in Milford, Connecticut
Duck Island, an island in Westbrook, Connecticut
Duck Key, Florida 
Great Duck Island, Maine (sometimes simply called Duck Island)
Duck Island (Isles of Shoals), Maine; see Isles of Shoals
Duck Island, Maryland, an island in Washington County, Maryland
Duck Island (Richland County, Montana), an island in the Yellowstone River in Montana
Duck Island (Valley County, Montana), an island in the Missouri River
Duck Island, in Squam Lake, New Hampshire
Duck Island, a district in the Tremont neighborhood of Cleveland, Ohio
Duck Island (New Jersey), a peninsula (formerly an island) at the confluence of the Delaware River and Crosswicks Creek
Duck Island, New Jersey, an unincorporated community on the northwest edge of the above peninsula
Duck Island (New York), an island in New York
Duck Island, in Green Lake (Seattle), Washington
Duck Island (Vilas County, Wisconsin) (near the border with Michigan)

Other places
Ap Chau, near Hong Kong is Chinese
Duck Island (Venezuela), in Gulf of Paria